Gene Ammons and Friends at Montreux is a live album by saxophonist Gene Ammons recorded at the Montreux Jazz Festival in 1973 and released on the Prestige label.

Reception
The AllMusic review states "This is one of the better late-period Gene Ammons records".

Track listing 
 "Yardbird Suite" (Charlie Parker) - 7:20     
 "Since I Fell for You" (Buddy Johnson) - 8:13     
 "New Sonny's Blues" (Sonny Stitt) - 7:23     
 "Sophisticated Lady" (Duke Ellington, Irving Mills, Mitchell Parish) - 5:32     
 "'Treux Bleu" (Gene Ammons) - 16:57

Personnel 
Gene Ammons - tenor saxophone 
Hampton Hawes - piano, electric piano
Bob Cranshaw - electric bass
Kenny Clarke - drums
Kenneth Nash - congas

On 'Treux Blue only add:
Cannonball Adderley - alto saxophone
Nat Adderley - cornet
Dexter Gordon - tenor saxophone

References 

1973 live albums
Prestige Records live albums
Gene Ammons live albums
Albums produced by Orrin Keepnews
albums recorded at the Montreux Jazz Festival